Ian Robins Dury (12 May 1942 27 March 2000) was a British singer, songwriter and actor who rose to fame during the late 1970s, during the punk and new wave era of rock music. He was the lead singer and lyricist of Ian Dury and the Blockheads and before that of Kilburn and the High Roads.

Biography

Early life
Dury was born, and spent his early years, at his parents' home at 43 Weald Rise, Harrow Weald, Middlesex (though he often pretended that he had been born in Upminster, Essex, which all but one of his obituaries in the UK national press stated as fact). His father, William George Dury (born 23 September 1905, Southborough, Kent; died 25 February 1968), was a local bus driver and former boxer, while his mother Margaret (known as "Peggy", born Margaret Cuthbertson Walker, 17 April 1910, Rochdale, Lancashire; died January 1995) was a health visitor, the daughter of a Cornish doctor and the granddaughter of an Irish landowner.

William Dury trained with Rolls-Royce to be a chauffeur, and was then absent for long periods, so Peggy Dury took Ian to stay with her parents in Cornwall. After the Second World War, the family moved to Switzerland, where his father chauffeured for a millionaire and the Western European Union. In 1946 Peggy brought Ian back to England and they stayed with her sister, Mary, a doctor in Cranham, a small village in Essex. Although he saw his father on visits, they never lived together again.

At the age of seven, Dury contracted polio, most likely, he believed, from a swimming pool at Southend-on-Sea during the 1949 polio epidemic. After six weeks in a full plaster cast in the Royal Cornwall Infirmary, Truro, he was moved to Black Notley Hospital, Braintree, Essex, where he spent a year and a half before going to Chailey Heritage Craft School, East Sussex, in 1951. His illness resulted in the paralysis and withering of his left leg, shoulder and arm.

Chailey was a school and hospital for disabled children, which believed in toughening them up, contributing to the observant and determined person Dury became. Chailey taught trades such as cobbling and printing, but Dury's mother wanted him to be more academic, so his aunt Moll arranged for him to enter the Royal Grammar School, High Wycombe, where he recounted being punished for misdemeanours by being made to learn long tracts of poetry until a housemaster found him sobbing and put a stop to it:
 He left the school at the age of 16 to study painting at the Walthamstow College of Art, having gained GCE 'O' Levels in English Language, English Literature and Art.

From 1964 he studied art at the Royal College of Art under Peter Blake, and in 1967 took part in a group exhibition, "Fantasy and Figuration", alongside Pat Douthwaite, Herbert Kitchen and Stass Paraskos at the Institute of Contemporary Arts in London. From 1967 he taught art at various colleges in the south of England. He also painted commercial illustrations for The Sunday Times in the early 1970s.

Kilburn and the High Roads
Dury formed Kilburn and the High Roads (a reference to the road in North West London) in 1971, and they played their first gig at Croydon School of Art on 5 December 1971. Dury was vocalist and lyricist, co-writing with pianist Russell Hardy and later enrolling into the group a number of the students he was teaching at Canterbury College of Art (now the University for the Creative Arts), including guitarist Keith Lucas (who later became the guitarist for 999 under the name Nick Cash) and bassist Humphrey Ocean.

Managed first by Charlie Gillett and Gordon Nelki and latterly by fashion entrepreneur Tommy Roberts, the Kilburns found favour on London's pub rock circuit and signed to Dawn Records in 1974 but, despite favourable press coverage and a tour opening for English rock band The Who, the group failed to rise above cult status and disbanded in 1975.

Kilburn and the High Roads recorded two albums, Handsome and Wotabunch!.

The Blockheads

Under the management of Andrew King and Peter Jenner, the original managers of Pink Floyd, Ian Dury and the Blockheads quickly gained a reputation as one of the top live acts of new wave music.

Dury's lyrics are a combination of lyrical poetry, word play, observation of British everyday life, character sketches, and sexual humour: "This is what we find ... Home improvement expert Harold Hill of Harold Hill, Of do-it-yourself dexterity and double-glazing skill, Came home to find another gentleman's kippers in the grill, So he sanded off his winkle with his Black & Decker drill". The song "Billericay Dickie" rhymes "I had a love affair with Nina, In the back of my Cortina" with "A seasoned-up hyena Could not have been more obscener".

The Blockheads' sound drew from its members' diverse musical influences, which included jazz, rock and roll, funk, and reggae, and Dury's love of music hall. The band was formed after Dury began writing songs with pianist and guitarist Chaz Jankel (the brother of music video, TV, commercial and film director Annabel Jankel). Jankel took Dury's lyrics, fashioned a number of songs, and they began recording with members of Radio Caroline's Loving Awareness Band drummer Charley Charles (born Hugh Glenn Mortimer Charles, Guyana 1945), bassist Norman Watt-Roy, keyboard player Mick Gallagher, guitarist John Turnbull and former Kilburns saxophonist Davey Payne. An album was completed, but major record labels passed on the band. Next door to Dury's manager's office was the newly formed Stiff Records, a perfect home for Dury's maverick style.

The single "Sex & Drugs & Rock & Roll", released 26 August 1977, marked Dury's Stiff debut. Although it was banned by the BBC it was named Single of the Week by NME on its release. The single issue was soon followed, at the end of September, by the album New Boots and Panties!! which, although it did not include the single (neither on the track list, album cover or record label, it was nonetheless actually present as track 1 on side 2 of all the original pressings), achieved platinum status.

In October 1977 Dury and his band started performing as Ian Dury & the Blockheads, when the band signed on for the Stiff "Live Stiffs Tour" alongside Elvis Costello & the Attractions, Nick Lowe, Wreckless Eric, and Larry Wallis. The tour was a success, and Stiff launched a concerted Ian Dury marketing campaign, resulting in the Top Ten hit "What a Waste" and the hit single "Hit Me with Your Rhythm Stick", which reached No. 1 in the UK at the beginning of 1979, selling just short of a million copies. Again, "Hit Me" was not included on the original release of the subsequent album Do It Yourself. With their hit singles, the band built up a dedicated following in the UK and other countries and their next single "Reasons to be Cheerful, Part 3" made number three in the UK.
The band's second album Do It Yourself was released in June 1979 in a Barney Bubbles-designed sleeve of which there were over a dozen variations, all based on samples from the Crown wallpaper catalogue. Bubbles also designed the Blockhead logo.

Jankel left the band temporarily and relocated to the US after the release of "What a Waste" (his organ part on that single was overdubbed later) but he subsequently returned to the UK and began touring sporadically with the Blockheads, eventually returning to the group full-time for the recording of "Hit Me with Your Rhythm Stick"; according to Mickey Gallagher, the band recorded 28 takes of the song but eventually settled on the second take for the single release. Partly due to personality clashes with Dury, Jankel left the group again in 1980, after the recording of the Do It Yourself LP, and he returned to the US to concentrate on his solo career.
The group worked solidly over the eighteen months between the release of "Rhythm Stick" and their next single, "Reasons to Be Cheerful", which returned them to the charts, making the UK Top 10. Jankel was replaced by former Dr. Feelgood guitarist Wilko Johnson, who also contributed to the next album Laughter (1980) and its two hit singles, although Gallagher recalls that the recording of the Laughter album was difficult and that Dury was drinking heavily in this period.

In 1980–81 Dury and Jankel teamed up again with Sly and Robbie and the Compass Point All Stars to record Lord Upminster (1981). The Blockheads toured the UK and Europe throughout 1981, sometimes augmented by jazz trumpeter Don Cherry, ending the year with their only tour of Australia.
The Blockheads disbanded in early 1982 after Dury secured a new recording deal with Polydor Records through A&R man Frank Neilson. Choosing to work with a group of young musicians which he named the Music Students, he recorded the album Four Thousand Weeks' Holiday. This album marked a departure from his usual style and was not as well received by fans for its American jazz influence.

The Blockheads briefly reformed in June 1987 to play a short tour of Japan, and then disbanded again. In September 1990, following the death from cancer of drummer Charley Charles, they reunited for two benefit concerts in aid of Charles' family, held at The Forum, Camden Town, with Steven Monti on drums. In December 1990, augmented by Merlin Rhys-Jones on guitar and Will Parnell on percussion, they recorded the live album Warts & Audience at the Brixton Academy.

The Blockheads (minus Jankel, who returned to California) toured Spain in January 1991, then disbanded again until August 1992 when, following Jankel's return to England, they were invited to reform for the Madstock! Festival in Finsbury Park; this was followed by sporadic gigs in Europe, Ireland, the UK and Japan in late 1994 and 1995. In the early 1990s, Dury appeared with English band Curve on the benefit compilation album Peace Together. Dury and Curve singer Toni Halliday shared vocals on a cover of the Blockheads' track "What a Waste".

In March 1996 Dury was diagnosed with cancer and, after recovering from an operation, he set about writing another album. In late 1996 he reunited with the Blockheads to record the album Mr. Love Pants (1997). Ian Dury & the Blockheads resumed touring, with Dylan Howe replacing Steven Monti on drums. Davey Payne left the group permanently in August and was replaced by Gilad Atzmon; this line-up gigged throughout 1999, culminating in their last performance with Ian Dury on 6 February 2000 at the London Palladium. Dury died six weeks later on 27 March 2000.

The Blockheads have continued after Dury's death, contributing to the tribute album Brand New Boots And Panties, then Where's The Party. The Blockheads currently comprise Jankel, Watt-Roy, Gallagher, Turnbull, John Roberts on drums, Gilad Atzmon and Dave Lewis on saxes. Derek The Draw (who was Dury's friend and minder) is now writing songs with Jankel as well as singing. Lee Harris is their 'aide-de-camp'.

Roger Daltrey
In 1984, Dury was featured in the music video for the minor hit single "Walking in My Sleep" by Roger Daltrey of The Who.

Spasticus Autisticus
Dury's 1981 song "Spasticus Autisticus" written to show his disdain for that year's International Year of Disabled Persons, which he saw as patronising and counter-productive was banned by the BBC from being broadcast by the BBC before 6 p.m. The lyrics were uncompromising:
    So place your hard-earned peanuts in my tin
    And thank the Creator you're not in the state I'm in
    So long have I been languished on the shelf
    I must give all proceedings to myself
The song's refrain, "I'm spasticus, autisticus", was inspired by the response of the rebellious Roman gladiators in the film Spartacus, who, when instructed to identify their leader, all answered, "I am Spartacus", to protect him. According to Professor George McKay, in his 2009 article "Crippled with nerves" (an early Dury song title), for Popular Music:

Dury described the song as "a war cry" on Desert Island Discs. The song was used at the opening of the London 2012 Paralympics.

Acting and other activities

Dury's confident and unusual demeanour caught the eyes of producers and directors of drama. His first important and extensive role was in Farrukh Dhondy's mini-series for the BBC King of the Ghetto (1986), a drama set in London's multi-racial Brick Lane area with a cast led by a young Tim Roth.

Dury had small parts in several films, probably the best known of which was Peter Greenaway's
The Cook, the Thief, His Wife & Her Lover (1989), as well as a cameo appearance in Roman Polanski's Pirates (1986). He also appeared in the Eduardo Guedes film  Rocinante (1986), the German comedy Brennende Betten (Burning Beds) (1988), Alejandro Jodorowsky's The Rainbow Thief (1990), and the Sylvester Stallone science fiction film Judge Dredd (1995). His other film appearances included roles in Number One (1985) starring Bob Geldof, the Bob Hoskins film The Raggedy Rawney (1988), and Split Second (1992) starring Rutger Hauer and Kim Cattrall. He also appeared alongside fellow lyricists Bob Dylan and Tom Waits, respectively, in the movies Hearts of Fire (1987) and Bearskin: An Urban Fairytale (1990), also by Eduardo Guedes. His later films included the comedy Different for Girls (1996), and The Crow: City of Angels (1996), directed by Tim Pope, who had directed a few of Dury's music videos.

Dury also wrote a musical, Apples, staged in London's Royal Court Theatre. In 1987 he appeared as the narrator (Scullery) in Road, also at the Royal Court. Among the cast was actress and singer Jane Horrocks, who cohabited with Dury until late in 1988, although the relationship was kept discreet.

Dury wrote and performed the theme song "Profoundly in Love with Pandora" for the television series The Secret Diary of Adrian Mole, Aged 13¾ (1985), based on the book of the same name by Sue Townsend, as well as its follow-up, The Growing Pains of Adrian Mole (1987). Dury turned down an offer from Andrew Lloyd Webber to write the libretto for Cats (from which Richard Stilgoe reportedly earned millions). The reason, said Dury, "I can't stand his music."

When AIDS first came to prominence in the mid-1980s, Dury was among celebrities who appeared on UK television to promote safe sex, demonstrating how to put on a condom using a model of an erect penis. In the 1990s, he became an ambassador for UNICEF, recruiting stars such as Robbie Williams to publicise the cause. The two visited Sri Lanka in this capacity to promote polio vaccination. Dury appeared with Curve on the Peace Together concert and CD (1993), performing "What a Waste", with benefits to the Youth of Northern Ireland. He also supported the charity Cancer BACUP.

Dury appeared in the Classic Albums episode that focused on Steely Dan's album Aja. Dury commented that the album was one of the most "upful" he had ever heard, and that the album "lifted [his] spirits up" whenever he played it.

Dury also appeared at the end of the Carter USM track "Skywest & Crooked" narrating from the musical Man of La Mancha.

Personal life 
Dury married Elizabeth "Betty" Rathmell (born 12 August 1942, Leamington Spa, Warwickshire), on 3 June 1967 and they had two children, Jemima (born 4 January 1969, Hounslow, Greater London) and Baxter (born 18 December 1971, Wingrave, Buckinghamshire, England). Dury divorced Rathmell in 1985, but remained on good terms. He had a year-long relationship (1986–87) with actor Jane Horrocks, whom he met while they both performed a play, and they remained friends until his death. He cohabited with a young woman named Denise Roudette for six years after he moved to London, squatting at Oval Mansions in Kennington, which The Guardian referred to as "one of London's most notorious squatted buildings" and Dury himself dubbed "Catshit Mansions" while writing "most of his best songs there" according to The Guardian. Dury had two children, Bill and Albert, with his wife, sculptor Sophy Tilson.

Illness and death
Dury was diagnosed with colorectal cancer in 1996 and underwent surgery, but tumours were later found in his liver, and he was told that his condition was terminal. Upon learning of his illness, Dury and Sophy Tilson got married.

In 1998, his death was incorrectly announced on XFM radio by Bob Geldof, possibly due to hoax information from a listener. In 1999, Dury collaborated with Madness on their first original album in fourteen years on the track "Drip Fed Fred". It was one of his last recordings, though he also performed again with the Blockheads in mid-1999 at Ronnie Scott's in Soho. This was a special performance recorded for LWT's South Bank Show and the audience were invited fans and friends of the band and crew. His deteriorating condition was evident and he had to take rests between takes and be helped on and off stage.

Ian Dury & the Blockheads' last public performance was a charity concert in aid of Cancer BACUP on 6 February 2000 at the London Palladium, supported by Kirsty MacColl and Phill Jupitus. Dury was noticeably ill and again had to be helped on and off stage.

Dury died of metastatic colorectal cancer on 27 March 2000, aged 57, in Hampstead, London. An obituary in The Guardian called him "one of few true originals of the English music scene". The lead singer of Madness, Suggs, called him "possibly the finest lyricist we've seen". The Ian Dury website opened an online book of condolence shortly after his death, which was signed by hundreds of fans. He was cremated after a humanist funeral at Golders Green Crematorium with 250 mourners at the service, including fellow musicians Suggs and Jools Holland and other "celebrity fans" such as Member of Parliament (MP) Mo Mowlam.

Legacy

Dury's son, Baxter Dury, is also a singer. He sang a few of his father's songs at the wake after the funeral, and has released six of his own albums, including It's a Pleasure (2014), Prince of Tears (2017) and The Night Chancers (2020).

In 2002 a "musical bench" designed by Mil Stricevic was placed in a favoured viewing spot of Dury's near Poets' Corner, in the gardens of Pembroke Lodge, in Richmond Park, south-west London. The back of the bench is inscribed with the words "Reasons to be cheerful", the title of one of Dury's songs. This solar powered seat was intended to allow visitors to plug in and listen to eight of his songs as well as an interview.

In 1999 the autobiographical documentary On My Life, directed by Mike Connolly, was released. The film, in which Dury recalled his life and career, intercut with concert footage, included contributions from painter Peter Blake and members of the Blockheads. The programme was broadcast in August 2009 on BBC Four.

Between 6 January and 14 February 2009 a musical about his life, entitled Hit Me! The Life & Rhymes of Ian Dury, was premiered and ran at the Leicester Square Theatre in London.

A biopic entitled Sex & Drugs & Rock & Roll starring Andy Serkis as Dury was released on 8 January 2010, and was nominated for several awards. Ray Winstone and Naomie Harris also appeared. The title of the film is derived from Dury's 1977 7" single "Sex & Drugs & Rock & Roll". Also in 2010 music journalist Will Birch published Ian Dury: The Definitive Biography which was well received.

A musical, Reasons to be Cheerful, was produced by the Graeae Theatre Company in association with Theatre Royal Stratford East and New Wolsey Theatre. Set in 1979 the musical featured Dury classics in a "riotous coming-of-age tale". The 2010 production was supported by the Blockheads, while Sir Peter Blake donated a limited edition print of the "Reasons to be Cheerful" artwork.

Interviewed by the Evening Standard in 2010, son Baxter said his father "was like a "Polaris missile"... "He would seek out someone's weakness in seconds, and then lock onto it. That's how he controlled his environment. It was very funny, in a gruesome kind of way ... if it wasn't you he was picking on. But it was a strange obsession, too. Like, why do you want to be like that? He was never really physically violent he was a small disabled guy but there was a lot of mental violence."

Speaking to BBC Radio 2 in February 2021, English pop star Robbie Williams cited Dury as his biggest inspiration as a lyricist. Williams sings on the final track of the posthumously released album Ten More Turnips from the Tip.

Discography

New Boots and Panties!! (1977)
Do It Yourself (1979)
Laughter (1980)
Lord Upminster (1981)
4,000 Weeks' Holiday (1984)
Apples (1989)
The Bus Driver's Prayer & Other Stories (1992)
Mr. Love Pants (1998)
Ten More Turnips from the Tip (2002)

Acting credits

References

Further reading
 Guinness Book of British Hit Singles 7th Edition, 1989, Guinness Publishing. 
  McKay, George (2009). '"Crippled with nerves": popular music and polio, with particular reference to Ian Dury'. Popular Music vol. 28:3, pp. 341–365.
 McKay, George (2013). Shakin' All Over: Popular Music and Disability. Ann Arbor: University of Michigan Press.
 Birch, Will (2011). Ian Dury: The Definitive Biography, Pan Publishing,

External links

  – official site
 theblockheads.com: The Blockheads' Biography
 theblockheads.com: The Blockheads' Discography
 
 BBC News website report on Dury's funeral
 BBC Music artist biography
 Dury's obituary in The Times
 BBC iPlayer Desert Island Discs, 31 March 1996

1942 births
2000 deaths
20th-century English male actors
20th-century English male singers
20th-century English singers
20th-century English male writers
Academics of the University for the Creative Arts
Alumni of the Royal College of Art
Alumni of Walthamstow College of Art
The Blockheads members
Deaths from cancer in England
Dawn Records artists
Deaths from colorectal cancer
English male singer-songwriters
English new wave musicians
English people with disabilities
English punk rock musicians
Epic Records artists
Golders Green Crematorium
Male new wave singers
Musicians from Kent
People educated at the Royal Grammar School, High Wycombe
People from Cornwall
People from Harrow, London
People from Upminster
People with polio
Polydor Records artists
Protopunk musicians
20th-century squatters
Stiff Records artists